"Capital G" is a song by American industrial rock band Nine Inch Nails from their fifth studio album, Year Zero (2007). It was released on June 11, 2007 as a limited-edition nine-inch vinyl in the United Kingdom, serving as the album's second and final single.

Music and lyrics
Though numerous reviews of the album speculated that "G" might refer to the first initial of George W. Bush, Trent Reznor stated that the "G" stands for "greed".

Release and reception
"Capital G" was not released with a Halo number due to Reznor's increasing awareness of the overpricing of retail music, and his record label's alleged plans to overprice Halo releases to take advantage of Nine Inch Nails' dedicated fan base. Art collaborator Rob Sheridan confirmed this fact:

The song was first played on radio on April 4, 2007. As of April 27, 2007, "Capital G" is listed on the Mediabase Jump! and Taking Off charts, which record the track's increase in radio airplay over seven days. "Capital G" officially became available for airplay on May 14–15, although it received the most adds in the alternative category during the week of April 27, according to Radio & Records.

The song is available for download as an "exhibit" in WAV format at exterminal.net, a website within the Year Zero alternate reality game revealed by decrypting a binary code sequence on the Year Zeros thermo-chrome disc when heated.

On April 26, 2007, the official Year Zero website published the multitrack audio files of "Capital G" for GarageBand and Logic Pro, as well as WAV files for other applications.

The song is available for download in the video game Rock Band.

"Capital G" is Nine Inch Nails' fifth consecutive top 10 single on the Billboard Hot Modern Rock Tracks chart.

Formats and track listings
UK limited-edition 9" single
A. "Capital G" – 3:49
B. "Survivalism" (Dave Sitek Mix) – 4:30

US promotional CD single 
"Capital G" (edit) – 3:49
"Capital G" (album) – 3:49

US promotional CD single 
"Capital G" (Phones 666 RPM Mix) – 7:23
"Capital G" (Switch Remix) – 5:01

German promotional CD single
"Capital G" (album) – 3:51
"Capital G" (edit) – 3:49

European promotional 12" single
A. "Capital G" (Phones 666 RPM Mix) – 7:23
B. "Capital G" (Switch Remix) – 5:01

Credits and personnel
 Trent Reznor – songwriting, production, vocals
 Josh Freese – drums
 Geoff "Double G" Gallegos – baritone saxophone
 Matt Demeritt – tenor saxophone
 Elizabeth Lea – trombone
 William Artope – trumpet
 Atticus Ross – production

Charts

See also
 List of anti-war songs

References

2007 singles
2007 songs
Glam rock songs
Interscope Records singles
Nine Inch Nails songs
Political songs
Song recordings produced by Atticus Ross
Song recordings produced by Trent Reznor
Songs about nuclear war and weapons
Songs written by Trent Reznor
Year Zero (game)